Cocoanut Grove (or Coconut Grove) may refer to:

Places
Coconut Grove, a neighborhood in Miami
Coconut Grove (Metrorail station), serving the above location
Coconut Grove, Northern Territory, Australia, a suburb of Darwin, Northern Territory

Nightclubs
Cocoanut Grove (Ambassador Hotel), a nightclub at the Ambassador Hotel in Los Angeles)
Cocoanut Grove (Santa Cruz), ballroom at the Santa Cruz Beach Boardwalk
Cocoanut Grove, a nightclub on the roof of the Century Theatre (New York City)
Cocoanut Grove, a nightclub on the roof of the Park Central Hotel, New York, New York

Films
Cocoanut Grove (film), a 1938 musical film
The Coo-Coo Nut Grove, a 1936 animated short

Music
"Cocoanut Grove", a song by Harry Owens featured in the 1938 film
"Coconut Grove", a 1966 song by The Lovin' Spoonful from the album Hums of the Lovin' Spoonful

Other uses
 Cocoanut Grove fire, a nightclub fire in Boston, Massachusetts in 1942
 Battle of the Coconut Grove, a battle between United States Marine Corps and Imperial Japanese Army forces on Bougainville, 13–14 November 1943